Tomy Drissi (born December 9, 1958) is an American professional stock and sports car racing driver, and an advertising executive in the movie industry. A long-time competitor in the Sports Car Club of America's Trans-Am Series, he was the series' 2009 Champion.

Racing career
Drissi first became involved in motorsports through his participation in illegal street racing, primarily on Mulholland Drive in Hollywood's Hollywood Hills, starting at the age of 16. He began legitimate competition in 1993, when he became involved in vintage racing, primarily at Willow Springs Raceway. Drissi's driving style proved "too aggressive" for the fragile vintage cars, and he moved to standard, modern race cars, making his debut in professional racing in 1999. Competing in the SCCA Trans-Am Series, Drissi won Rookie of the Year in his initial season. He would score his first win in the series the following year at the Long Beach Grand Prix. Competing in the series both before and after its mid-2000s hiatus, he won the first championship of the revitalized series in 2009.

Drissi also competed in the SCCA World Challenge series between 2006 and 2010; in 2003, he had begun competing in the sports cars of the American Le Mans Series, where he would make his primary effort in racing outside of Trans-Am; he currently drives in the series for RSR Racing, competing in the Prototype Challenge class, co-driving an Oreca FLM09 with Bruno Junqueira and Roberto González. , he has scored two class wins during his career in the series, both coming during the 2011 season at the Mid-Ohio Sports Car Course and at the Baltimore Grand Prix.

Drissi also competed in nine Rolex Sports Car Series events in 2005 and 2006, posting a best finish of ninth on the road course at Phoenix International Raceway in September 2005.

NASCAR

In 2010, Drissi took a test drive with Rick Ware Racing at Carolina Motorsports Park, hoping to kickstart some NASCAR activism. Drissi later made his debut in stock car competition, driving the No. 82 Dodge Charger for MacDonald Motorsports in the NASCAR Nationwide Series, competing in the NAPA Auto Parts 200 at Circuit Gilles Villeneuve in Montreal. He finished 18th in the event; the following year he would drive in two races in the Nationwide Series, driving the No. 75 Ford for Rick Ware Racing at Watkins Glen International, where he finished 27th, and at Montreal, finishing 34th. Drissi also competed in a single NASCAR K&N Pro Series West race in 2011 on the road course at Portland International Raceway, driving the No. 12 Toyota for Bill McAnally Racing; he would finish 22nd in the event.

Drissi drove the No. 26 car for Rick Ware Racing in the 2015 NASCAR Xfinity Series road course races at Road America, Watkins Glen, and Mid Ohio Sports Car Course with a best finish of 25th place. In 2016, Drissi joined TriStar Motorsports' #14 Arthritis Foundation Toyota, for the road races. On lap 17 of the Zippo 200 at the Glen, Drissi was injured during a 5-car pileup in the esses. It forced him to withdraw from the rest of the race as well as the following week's race at Mid-Ohio. Drissi recovered from the injury and returned to the #14 team weeks later at Road America where he finished 26th.

Monster Energy Cup Series

In 2011, established as a "road course ringer", Drissi was hired by Max Q Motorsports, which had entered into a partnership with Rick Ware Racing, to drive the team's No. 37 Ford, sponsored by the movie Rise of the Planet of the Apes, in the NASCAR Sprint Cup Series at the Toyota/Save Mart 350 at Infineon Raceway. Drissi was not approved by NASCAR to compete in the event due to not having sufficient experience in the heavy Sprint Cup cars; Chris Cook substituted for Drissi, qualifying and driving the car in the event.

Drissi returned to Infineon (now known as Sonoma) for the 2012 Toyota/Save Mart 350, being hired to drive the No. 10 Chevrolet, sponsored by Ice Age: Continental Drift, for Tommy Baldwin Racing. Drissi returned to Sonoma in the 2013 Toyota/Save Mart 350 for NEMCO-Jay Robinson Racing, driving the No. 87 Toyota sponsored by The Wolverine, and drove again for the team at Watkins Glen International with sponsorship promoting The Counselor. A year later, he joined Identity Ventures Racing in the No. 66 Toyota with sponsorship from Hercules at Sonoma. He started last and finished 38th.

After four years away from Cup racing, he returned to the series for the 2018 Toyota/Save Mart 350, driving the No. 00 for StarCom Racing.

Trans-Am bans

During the race at Mid-Ohio on August 15, 2015, he started from pole position in a Tony Ave Racing machine, but lost a couple of places after battling with championship contender Amy Ruman coming out of "The Keyhole". Drissi drove aggressively towards the front, spinning out his teammate Paul Fix and was given an in-race warning by stewards.

When the caution came out he passed some cars – which he got penalized for later on in the race – and drove next to Ruman and showed his unhappiness with her by touching her car a few times lightly. After serving his drive-through penalty for avoidable contact, Drissi waited for Ruman, who was leading the race at the moment, to drive just behind him and then he tried to block her from putting him a lap down. Coming out of "The Keyhole" Ruman made the pass and Drissi purposely crashed into her and both cars went back across the track taking out himself, Ruman and Doug Peterson, one of Drissi's teammates, who was running second at the time. Drissi was assessed a match penalty, while Ruman would recover to finish in the top-20. After the race concluded, Drissi's #71 was stricken from the race results, along with his points and prize money, pending a final ruling from Trans-Am chief steward, James Foyle. The following month, Drissi was assessed the maximum suspension allowed by SCCA, which is one full calendar year. Drissi motioned to appeal, but it was upheld.

Ruman said during a post-race interview, which aired on CBS Sports Network: "Tomy Drissi is the most unprofessional, unsportsmanlike, unimaginable, worst driver in what he calls a professional sport. What he did was unacceptable today, he trashed my car, he blocked us, we were winning the championship, this is the third year in a row he's hit me, he has a vendetta against me. He's unprofessional and it's unacceptable what happened here today."

Drissi returned to Trans Am for the 2017 season, but was subsequently suspended after being involved in a physical altercation at Indianapolis Motor Speedway on June 17, 2017. On August 7, 2017, Drissi was reinstated and placed on probation after agreeing to fulfill undisclosed terms and conditions by Trans Am.

Personal life
Drissi is the owner of a Hollywood advertising agency that produces film displays for promoting upcoming films in cinemas. He is married to Lacy Livingston Drissi and they have two children.

Motorsports career results

NASCAR
(key) (Bold – Pole position awarded by qualifying time. Italics – Pole position earned by points standings or practice time. * – Most laps led.)

Monster Energy Cup Series

Xfinity Series

 Season still in progress
 Ineligible for series points

References

External links

 
 
 Tomy Drissi at Driver Database

Living people
1958 births
People from Hollywood, Los Angeles
Racing drivers from Los Angeles
Racing drivers from California
American Le Mans Series drivers
Rolex Sports Car Series drivers
Porsche Supercup drivers
Trans-Am Series drivers
NASCAR drivers
24 Hours of Daytona drivers
WeatherTech SportsCar Championship drivers
Indy Pro 2000 Championship drivers
Rocketsports Racing drivers
JDC Motorsports drivers